Pat Cash and Chris Johnstone were the defending champions, but did not participate together this year.  Cash partnered Mike Bauer, losing in the quarterfinals.  Johnstone partnered Wayne Hampson, losing in the quarterfinals.

Craig A. Miller and Eric Sherbeck won the title, defeating Broderick Dyke and Rod Frawley 6–3, 4–6, 6–4 in the final.

Seeds

  Mike Bauer /  Pat Cash (quarterfinals)
  Broderick Dyke /  Rod Frawley (final)
  John Alexander /  John Fitzgerald (first round)
  David Graham /  Laurie Warder (semifinals)

Draw

Draw

References
Draw

Next Generation Adelaide International
1983 Grand Prix (tennis)
1983 South Australian Open